Natalya Ihorivna Synyshyn (born 3 July 1985) is a Ukrainian-Azerbaijani freestyle wrestler, who played for the lightweight division. She is a two-time bronze medalist at the World Championships, and three-time at the European Championships.

Career
Synyshyn competed for Ukraine in the women's 55-kg class in freestyle wrestling at the 2008 Summer Olympics in Beijing. In the first preliminary round, she was defeated by Marcie Van Dusen of the United States, after being taken off the mat by her opponent in the final period, with a three-set score (0–4, 1–1, 7–0), and a classification point score of 1–3.

On 11 March 2016, she won European Wrestling Championships for Azerbaijan. She won a bronze medal at the 2016 Summer Olympics.

References

External links
 
NBC 2008 Olympics profile

Living people
1985 births
People from Chervonohrad
Ukrainian female sport wrestlers
Azerbaijani female sport wrestlers
Ukrainian emigrants to Azerbaijan
Naturalized citizens of Azerbaijan
Olympic wrestlers of Ukraine
Wrestlers at the 2008 Summer Olympics
European Games medalists in wrestling
European Games bronze medalists for Azerbaijan
Wrestlers at the 2015 European Games
World Wrestling Championships medalists
Wrestlers at the 2016 Summer Olympics
Olympic wrestlers of Azerbaijan
Olympic bronze medalists for Azerbaijan
Olympic medalists in wrestling
Medalists at the 2016 Summer Olympics
European Wrestling Championships medalists
Islamic Solidarity Games medalists in wrestling
Islamic Solidarity Games competitors for Azerbaijan
Sportspeople from Lviv Oblast